Ara Junction railway station (station code: ARA), is a railway station serving the city of Arrah in the Bhojpur district in the Indian state of Bihar. The Ara Junction railway station is well connected to most of the major cities in India by the railway network. It lies in between Buxar and Patna on Patna-Mughalsarai section of Howrah-Patna-Delhi main line which serves it with numerous trains.

Arrah is well connected to Patna, New Delhi, Mumbai, Kolkata, Bangalore, Kanpur, Pune, Ahmedabad, Chennai, Lucknow, Agra, Prayagraj, Varansi, Bhopal, Jaipur, Surat, Kota, Amritsar, Chandigarh, Secunderabad, Guwahati, Ranchi, Jammu and Kashmir, Ajmer , Goa, Ernakulam, Anand Vihar Terminal, Jhansi, Jodhpur, Haridwar, Mysuru, Dibrugarh and other cities of India.

Facilities 
The major facilities available are waiting rooms, retiring room, computerized reservation facility, reservation counter, vehicle parking, etc.  Vehicles are allowed to enter the station premises. There are refreshment rooms vegetarian and non vegetarian, tea stall, book stall, post and telegraphic office and Government Railway police (G.R.P) office. Automatic ticket vending machines have been installed to reduce the queue for train tickets on the station. and a gusarkhana.

Platforms
There are four platforms at Arrah Junction. The platforms are interconnected with two pedestrian over-bridges (FOB).

References

Railway stations in Bhojpur district, India
Railway junction stations in Bihar
Danapur railway division
Arrah